Sheridan County Courthouse may refer to:

 Sheridan County Courthouse (Kansas), Hoxie, Kansas
 Sheridan County Courthouse (Nebraska), Rushville, Nebraska
 Sheridan County Courthouse (North Dakota), McClusky, North Dakota
 Sheridan County Courthouse (Wyoming), Sheridan, Wyoming